Hamid Khan Lodi was the founder of the Lodi dynasty of Multan. He ruled the Emirate of Multan from 985 to 997.

Biography
Hamid Khan Lodi was supposedly a descendant of Sama (or Usama) Lawi who was son of Ghalib Lawi. Although Firishta wrote that he was from the Lodi tribe of Pashtuns, historians Yogendra Mishra and Henry George Raverty said he was from the Quraysh tribe of Arabs. According to Henry George Raverty and Samuel Miklos Stern, the Lodi dynasty itself might have been fabricated as its mention only starts appearing with later historians like Firishta.

According to Firishta, the Hindu Shahi king Jayapala ceded the regions of Multan and Lamghan to Hamid Lodi, after joining an alliance with him and the Muslim emir of Bhera against the raids of Sabuktigin during the reign of Alp-Tegin. Sabuktigin upon becoming amir in Ghazni broke up this alliance through diplomatic means and convinced Hamid Lodi to acknowledge his overlordship.

He ruled the Emirate of Multan after the death of the Fatimid da'i Jalam ibn Shaban around 985 AD. He was succeeded by his grandson, Fateh Daud.

References

10th-century Arabs
History of Multan
10th-century rulers in Asia